Kodinar is one of the 182 Legislative Assembly constituencies of Gujarat state in India. It is part of Gir Somnath district and is reserved for candidates belonging to the Scheduled Castes.

List of segments

This assembly seat represents the following segments,

 Kodinar Taluka
 Una Taluka (Part) Villages – Kansariya, Jamvala, Bhakha, Thordi, Babariya, Sanvav, Jaragli, Ankolali, Panderi, Dhrabavad, Velakot, Jhanjhariya, Sonpura, Bhiyal, Bodidar, Kaneri, Maghardi, Ambavad, Kanakiya, Simasi, Ranvasi, Bhebha, Madhgam, Revad, Lerka, Chikhli, Sokhda, Kajardi, Kob, Bhingran, Tad.

Members of Legislative Assembly

Election results

2022

2017

2012

See also
 List of constituencies of Gujarat Legislative Assembly
 Gujarat Legislative Assembly

References

External links
 

Assembly constituencies of Gujarat
Gir Somnath district